State Road 608 (SR 608) is a  east–west street serving the area north of Fort Pierce in St. Lucie County, Florida. Locally known as St. Lucie Boulevard, the road extends westward and eastward as County Road 608 (CR 608).

Its current western terminus is SR 613. The road becomes SR 608 at an intersection with SR 615, and the eastern terminus is an intersection with U.S. Route 1 (US 1 and SR 5), where the CR 608 designation resumes for one block to Dixie Highway (CR 605) in the Hunt Subdivision.

History
Originally, SR 608 extended westward another , terminating at Kings Highway (SR 713), a heavily used two-lane road connecting Florida's Turnpike (SR 91) with US 1. This is now County Road 608, which serves the St. Lucie County Airport.

Major intersections

References

External links

608
608
State highways in the United States shorter than one mile